Respirovirus is a genus of viruses in the order Mononegavirales, in the family Paramyxoviridae. Rodents and human serve as natural hosts. There are seven species in this genus. Diseases associated with this genus include: croup and other acute febrile respiratory tract infections.

Structure
Respirovirions are enveloped, with spherical geometries. The diameter is around 150 nm. Respirovirus genomes are linear, around 15kb in length. The genome codes for 8 proteins.

Life cycle
Viral replication is cytoplasmic. Entry into the host cell is achieved by virus attaches to host cell. Replication follows the negative stranded RNA virus replication model. Negative stranded RNA virus transcription, using polymerase stuttering is the method of transcription. Translation takes place by leaky scanning, and ribosomal shunting. The virus exits the host cell by budding. Rodents and  human serve as the natural host. Transmission routes are respiratory.

References

External links
 ICTV Report: Paramyxoviridae
 Viralzone: Respirovirus

Virus genera
Paramyxoviridae